was a Japanese former professional boxer who competed from 1959 to 1969. He held the WBA, WBC, and The Ring flyweight titles from 1963 to 1964 and the WBA flyweight title again in 1969. Yuri Arbachakov used the ring name Yuri Ebihara in honor of him and the Pokémon , known as Hitmonchan in the English-speaking world, is named after him.

Professional boxing record

See also
List of flyweight boxing champions
List of Japanese boxing world champions
Boxing in Japan
Hitmonchan

References

External links

Cyber Boxing Zone - Hiroyuki Ebihara

1940 births
1991 deaths
Flyweight boxers
World flyweight boxing champions
World Boxing Association champions
World Boxing Council champions
The Ring (magazine) champions
People from Fussa, Tokyo
Boxing commentators
Sportspeople from Tokyo
Japanese male boxers
20th-century Japanese people